The Otter River is a short connecting stream in Minnesota, flowing from Boulder Lake Reservoir into Island Lake Reservoir. It is within the Cloquet River watershed, north of Duluth.

See also
List of rivers of Minnesota

References

External links
Minnesota Watersheds
USGS Hydrologic Unit Map - State of Minnesota (1974)

Rivers of Minnesota